Olivella dolichomorpha is a species of small sea snail, marine gastropod mollusk in the subfamily Olivellinae, in the family Olividae, the olives.  Species in the genus Olivella are commonly called dwarf olives.

Description
The length of the shell attains 14.1 mm.

Distribution
This marine species occurs off Martinique.

References

 Paulmier G. (2015). Les Olivellidae (Neogastropoda) des Antilles françaises. Description de quatre nouvelles espèces. Xenophora Taxonomy. 8: 3-23

dolichomorpha
Gastropods described in 2007